Mehedi Hasan Ujjal is a retired Bangladeshi professional footballer who played as an attacking midfielder. He spent majority of his career with Abahani Limited Dhaka. Ujjal made a name for himself in the Western Union Senior Division Football League during the early 2000s, while playing for Abahani. 

He last played club football for Muktijoddha Sangsad KC during the 2020–21 Bangladesh Premier League season. Ujjal played for the Bangladesh national football team from 2003 to 2011, and was used as a creative midfielder during his tenure with the national team under numerous different coaches.

International goals

Bangladesh U23

Honours

Bangladesh
 SAFF Championship: 2003

References

1985 births
Living people
Bangladeshi footballers
Bangladesh international footballers
Bangladesh youth international footballers
Association football midfielders
Mohammedan SC (Dhaka) players
Abahani Limited (Dhaka) players
Abahani Limited (Chittagong) players
Muktijoddha Sangsad KC players
Bangladesh Football Premier League players